Bissa may refer to:
Bissa people
Bissa language
Bissa, Burkina Faso (disambiguation)